This is the discography of Loudness, a pioneering Japanese heavy metal band formed in 1981 in Osaka. It consists of 26 studio albums, three EPs, eight live albums, 15 singles and 16 compilation albums, thus making Loudness one of the world's most prolific heavy metal bands.

Discography

Albums

Studio albums

Live albums

Compilations

EPs

Singles

Videography

References

Heavy metal group discographies
Discographies of Japanese artists